Ghogharo is a village and deh in Qambar taluka of Qambar Shahdadkot District, Sindh, Pakistan. It is a predominantly agricultural village, with major crops including rice paddies and wheat fields, and it has a population of about 5000. The people speak Sindhi and Siraiki, and they belong to many different tribes: Mangan,Wagan Chandio, Bhatti, Khokhar, Babar, Kori, Khaskheli, and Meo Rajput are the main ones.

It has historically been known for its rice production, being considered one of the best rice producers in Sindh.

References 

Populated places in Qambar Shahdadkot District